"Beat Generation / No More Distance" is the 3rd single by the Japanese girl idol group Fairies,  released in Japan on April 4, 2012, on the label Sonic Groove (a subsidiary of Avex Group).dfd

It is a double-A-side single.

The physical CD single debuted at number 5 in the Oricon weekly singles chart.

Release 
The single was released in three versions: CD-only, CD+DVD and CD+paperfile.

Track listing

CD+DVD edition

CD-only edition

CD+paperfile edition

Charts

Single

"Beat Generation"

Awards 

|-
| 2012
| "Beat Generation"
| Japan Cable Awards — Excellence Award 
| 
|-

References

External links 
 Discography on the official website of Fairies

2012 singles
Japanese-language songs
Fairies (Japanese group) songs
2012 songs
Avex Group singles
Song articles with missing songwriters